Dobrošane is a village in the municipality of Kumanovo, North Macedonia.

Demographics
As of the 2021 census, Dobrošane had 1,889 residents with the following ethnic composition:
Macedonians 1,666
Persons for whom data are taken from administrative sources 112
Serbs 47
Vlachs 26
Roma 23
Others 15

According to the 2002 census, the village had a total of 1,655 inhabitants. Ethnic groups in the village include:
Macedonians 1,571
Serbs 17
Romani 24
Bosniaks 1
Aromanians 39
Others 3

References

External links

Villages in Kumanovo Municipality